Steve Cantamessa is an American sound engineer. He won an Academy Award for Best Sound for the film Ray. He has worked on over 75 films and television shows since 1978.

Selected filmography
 Ray (2004)
 Gone Girl (2014)

References

External links

Year of birth missing (living people)
Living people
American audio engineers
Best Sound Mixing Academy Award winners
Best Sound BAFTA Award winners
Place of birth missing (living people)
Primetime Emmy Award winners